The 1920 Michigan Wolverines football team was an American football team that represented the University of Michigan in the Big Ten Conference during the 1920 college football season. In its 20th season under head coach Fielding H. Yost, the team compiled a 5–2 record (2–2 against conference opponents), finished sixth in the Big Ten, and outscored opponents by a total of 121 to 21.

Left tackle Angus Goetz was the team captain.  Other notable players included halfbacks Frank Steketee and Eddie Usher, right tackle Tad Wieman, left end Franklin Cappon, right end Paul G. Goebel, left guard Robert J. Dunne, and center Ernie Vick.

Schedule

Players

Varsity letter winners

The following 16 players received their "M" letter for their play on the 1920 football team.
Ted Bank, Flint, Michigan - started 3 games at quarterback
Franklin Cappon, Holland, Michigan - started 7 games at left end
Abe Cohn, Spokane, Washington - started 1 game at left halfback
John Dunn, Ann Arbor, Michigan - started 4 games at quarterback
Robert J. Dunne, Chicago, Illinois - started 7 games at left guard
Paul G. Goebel, Grand Rapids, Michigan - started 7 games at right end
Angus Goetz, Sault Ste. Marie, Michigan - started 7 games at left tackle
James Edwards Johns, Lansing, Michigan - started 2 games at right tackle
Viggo O. Nelson, Ann Arbor, Michigan - started 7 games at fullback
John Perrin, Escanaba, Michigan - started 2 games at right halfback
Frank Steketee, Grand Rapids, Michigan - started 3 games at right halfback, 1 game at left halfback
Eddie Usher, Toledo, Ohio - started 6 games at left halfback, 1 game at right halfback
William J. Van Orden, Ann Arbor, Michigan - guard (not listed as starter in any games)
Ernie Vick, Toledo, Ohio - started 7 games at center
Tad Wieman, Los Angeles, California - started 5 games at right tackle
Hugh E. Wilson, Grand Rapids, Michigan - started 6 games at right guard

aMa letter winners

The following 13 players were awarded "aMa" letters for their work as backups on the 1920 team:
Grenville Andrews, St. Louis, Missouri - halfback
Allen R. Bailey, Cedar Falls, Iowa - halfback
William Fortune, Springfield, Illinois - guard
George M. Gilmore, Ann Arbor, Michigan - tackle
Louis C. Lehman, Newark, New Jersey - end
Charles C. Kreis, Detroit, Michigan
Meyer Paper, St. Paul, Minnesota - halfback
Charles C. Petro, Elyria, Ohio - guard
George E. Planck, Lansing, Michigan - guard
Richard H. Rowland, Buffalo, New York - end
John G. Searle, Evanston, Illinois - quarterback
Charles E. Trout, Toledo, Ohio
Horace Wachter, Toledo, Ohio - guard

Awards and honors
Captain: Angus Goetz
All-Americans: Angus Goetz (Walter Camp, 2nd team); Tad Wieman (Lawrence Perry, 2nd team)
All-Western: Ernie Vick, Frank Steketee (Eckersall, 1st team), Angus Goetz (Eckersall, 2nd team), Franklin Cappon (Eckersall, 2nd team)

Coaching staff

Head coach: Fielding H. Yost
Assistant coaches: Prentiss Douglass, A. J. Sturzenegger, Robert Watson, Edwin Mather, Derril Pratt
Trainer: Archie Hahn, William Fallon
Manager: Robert E. McKean

References

External links
 1920 Football Team -- Bentley Historical Library, University of Michigan Athletics History
 1920-1921 Michigan Alumnus - includes accounts of each game
 1921 Michiganensian

Michigan
Michigan Wolverines football seasons
Michigan Wolverines football